Anarestan (also Romanized as Anārestān) is a village in Anarestan Rural District, Chenar Shahijan District, Kazerun County, Fars Province, Iran. At the 2006 census, its population was 927, in 186 families.

References 

Populated places in Chenar Shahijan County